Offerton School was a state comprehensive secondary school located north of the A626 road near the River Goyt in Offerton, a suburb of Stockport, Greater Manchester. The school catered for pupils aged 11 to 16 and was maintained by the Metropolitan Borough of Stockport. Due to a forced closure issued by the government, the school ceased to  function in 2012.

The school was originally known as Offerton Secondary School for Girls, Curzon Road, which was the first school to be built on the 50 acre campus in 1955, built by Stockport Corporation. it has 600 Girls.

The second school to built in 1960 was Goyt Bank Technical High School for Girls. It was a two-form entry grammar technical school, with girls moving there from the former Greek Street High School for Girls in Stockport.

The third and final school to be built on the campus in 1964 was Stockport Technical High School for Boys. Stockport Technical High School (a boys' technical school) moved from Pendlebury Hall on Lancashire Hill to The Fairway at Offerton. It had 400 boys.

It became Goyt Bank School in September 1972 when Offerton Secondary School for Girls, Goyt Bank High School for Girls and Stockport Technical High School for Boys merged on the Offerton Campus. It had 1500 Girls and Boys.

In 1983 Goyt Bank merged with Dialstone Lane, and was renamed Offerton High School.  Later it became Offerton School.

Today, part of the former school site now houses Castle Hill High School, a special school that was relocated from Brinnington.

Goyt Bank High School for Girls
 Jean Llewellyn, Chief Executive since 2008 of the National Skills Academy for Nuclear

Stockport Technical High school
 Richard Banks, Managing Director since 2009 of Bradford & Bingley plc
Peter Piper (Graham Heywood) - Comedian - http://www.ents24.com/web/artist/157060/Peter_Piper.html

Jeff Mounkley, erstwhile captain, England Men's Lacrosse team

See also
 List of schools in Stockport

References

External links
 
 EduBase

Defunct schools in the Metropolitan Borough of Stockport
Educational institutions established in 1960
1960 establishments in England
Educational institutions disestablished in 2012
2012 disestablishments in England
Schools in Stockport